Diou is a village and rural commune in the Cercle of Kadiolo in the Sikasso Region of southern Mali. The commune covers an area of 137 square kilometers and includes 3 villages. In the 2009 census it had a population of 6,003. The village of Diou, the administrative center (chef-lieu) of the commune, is 24 km west of Kadiolo.

References

External links
.

Communes of Sikasso Region